Peroxisomal membrane protein 4 is a protein that in humans is encoded by the PXMP4 gene.

References

Further reading